Larry Bradford (December 21, 1949 – September 11, 1998) was a pitcher in Major League Baseball. He played for the Atlanta Braves. He died of a heart attack while visiting Turner Field at age 48 in 1998.

References

External links

1949 births
1998 deaths
Major League Baseball pitchers
Atlanta Braves players
African-American baseball players
Baseball players from Chicago
20th-century African-American sportspeople